Raymond John DiMuro (born October 12, 1967) is an American former Major League Baseball umpire. He made his debut on May 28, 1996, and umpired his last game on August 30, 1998.  He is also the son of former umpire Lou DiMuro and the twin brother of former major league umpire Mike DiMuro.

See also 

 List of Major League Baseball umpires

References

1967 births
Living people
People from Dunkirk, New York
Major League Baseball umpires
American twins
Twin sportspeople
Baseball people from New York (state)